Rafael Stupin (1798-1860s) was a Russian painter. He studied painting at the Academy in St. Petersburg from 1809 until 1818; he was granted the title of Academician in 1829. He is known to have taught for a time at a school in Arzamas.

References

 

19th-century painters from the Russian Empire
Russian male painters
1798 births
1860s deaths
19th-century male artists from the Russian Empire